Dover Road may refer to:

The former name of A2 road (Great Britain)
Dover Road (Reisterstown), a road in Reisterstown, Maryland
A road in Dover, Singapore
 The Dover Road (play), a play by A.A. Milne
 The Dover Road (film), a 1934 American film adaptation of the Milne play